Sweethearts is a 1990 Australian film directed by Colin Talbot and starring Christabel Wigley and John F. Howard. The screenplay is about Juliet and Laura, who are looking for excitement.

Sweethearts was based on a novel written in 1978. Talbot wrote the script in Bali in 1987 and made the film with the assistance of the AFC.

References

External links
Sweethearts at AustLit

Australian television films
1990 television films
1990 films
Films based on Australian novels
1990s English-language films